María Isabel Pérez Rodríguez (born 1 March 1993) is a Spanish Olympic athlete.

Personal life
She works as a physiotherapist in Seville. She is coached by her uncle Luis Rodríguez who competed for Spain at the 1991 World Athletics Championships.

International competitions

References

External links
 
 
 
 

1993 births
Living people
Spanish female sprinters
Olympic athletes of Spain
Olympic female sprinters
Athletes (track and field) at the 2020 Summer Olympics
Sportspeople from Seville
20th-century Spanish women
21st-century Spanish women